The Sanjak of Üsküp was one of the sanjaks in the Ottoman Empire, with Üsküb (modern-day Skopje) as its administrative centre.

Origins

Starting from the end of the 10th century Skopje experienced a period of wars and political troubles. It served as Bulgarian capital from 972 to 992, and Samuel of Bulgaria ruled it from 976 until 1004 when its governor Roman surrendered it to Byzantine Emperor Basil the Bulgar Slayer in 1004 in exchange for the titles of patrician and strategos. It became a centre of a new Byzantine province called Bulgaria. Skopje (Üsküb) had previously been the capital also of the short lived Serbian Empire between 1346 and 1371.

Üsküb became part of Ottoman Empire after it was captured from the District of Branković on January 6, 1392. The first Ottoman governor of Skopje was Pasha Yiğit Bey, who conquered Skopje for the Ottoman Empire. The next one was Isak-Beg who was sent to lead military actions in Serbia in spring of 1439, and was replaced by his son Isa-Beg Isaković in the position of sanjakbeg of the Sanjak of Skopje.

The sanjak was initially formed as the so-called krajište (Skopsko Krajište; lit. borderland of Skopje) that was transformed into a full sanjak in the mid-16th century.

History
The Sanjak of Üsküp had often been given to beylerbeys as arpalik. Up to the 19th century, the sanjak was part of the Eyalet of Rumelia.

Uprisings against the Ottoman government occurred in the sanjak in 1572, 1584, 1585 and 1595. During the Great Turkish War, Austrian general Silvio Piccolomini burnt down Skopje in 1689.

In 1868 the Sanjak of Skopje together with the Sanjak of Prizren, Sanjak of Dibra and Sanjak of Niš became part of the newly established Prizren Vilayet. When Kosovo Vilayet was established in 1877, the Prizren Vilayet (without several nahiyas annexed by the Serbia) and its Sanjak of Skopje became part of Kosovo Vilayet, with Skopje as its seat.

According to the Ottoman General Census of 1881/82-1893, the kaza (sub-district) of Usküp had a total population of 70.170, consisting of 40.256 Muslims, 22.497 Bulgarians, 6.655 Greeks, 724 Jews and 38 Latins.

During the First Balkan War in 1912 and the beginning of 1913, the Sandzak of Skopje was liberated by the Kingdom of Serbia. On the basis of the Treaty of London signed during the London Conference in 1913, its territory became a part of Serbia.

Demographics
According to the 1881–1882 and the 1905–1906 census of the Ottoman Empire, the population of the Sanjak of Üsküp is distributed, as follows:

Furthermore, according to the Ottoman salname for 1903, the population is distributed, as follows:
Bulgarians - 126,701
Muslims - 94,006
Greeks - 5,123
Serbs - 4,843
Others - N/A

List of governors
The earliest governors, of the so-called Skopje krajište:
 Pasha Yiğit Bey: (1392–1414)
 Ishak Bey: (1414–1439)
 Nesuh Bey: (1439–1454)
 Isa-Beg Ishaković: (1454–1463)

Sanjakbeys:
Mustafa Pasha Kara Mehmed-zade: (July 1755–?)
Osman Pasha: (September 1844 – August 1845)
Mehmed Selim Pasha Eneste Haseki: (August 1845 – March 1848)
Hafiz Mehmed Pasha the Cherkessian: (March 1848 – May 1850)
Ismail Pasha Paisli: (May 1850 – April 1851)
Mustafa Tosun Pasha: (April 1851 – October 1853)
Ali Riza Mehmed Pasha: (November 1853 – February 1854)
Akif Pasha: (1857–?)
Mahzar Osman Pasha Arnavut: (September 1858 – August 1859)
Rustem Pasha Ebubekir: August 1859 – March 1860
Alyanak Mustafa Pasha: (March 1860—July 1863)
Mahmud Faiz Pasha: (July 1863 – January 1864)
?
İsmail Hakkı Paşa Şehsüvarzade Leskovikli: (November 1865 – July 1869)
?
Hafuz Pasha: (fl. 1876–1900)

References

Literature

External links 
  Macedonia and the Macedonians: a history By Andrew Rossos

Sanjaks of the Ottoman Empire in Europe
Sanjak of Üsküp
Ottoman period in the history of Kosovo
Kosovo vilayet
Ottoman period in the history of North Macedonia
Ottoman Serbia
1463 establishments in the Ottoman Empire
1913 disestablishments in the Ottoman Empire
States and territories established in 1463
States and territories disestablished in 1913